During the 2004–05 season AFC Ajax participated in the Eredivisie, the KNVB Cup, the UEFA Champions League and the  UEFA Cup.

Pre-season
The first training session for the 2004–05 season was held on July 7, 2004. In preparation for the new season Ajax organized a training camp in De Lutte, Netherlands at the De Thij Sportpark. During the pre-season, the squad played friendly matches against FC Omniworld, DOS '19, Excelsior '31, HSV de Zuidvogels, Queens Park Rangers and Luton Town. They then returned to Amsterdam to play Panathinaikos and Arsenal in the annual Amsterdam Tournament.

Player statistics
Appearances for competitive matches only

|-
|colspan="14"|Players sold or loaned out after the start of the season:

|}

2004–05 selection by nationality

Team statistics

Eredivisie standings

Points by match day

Total points by match day

Standing by match day

Goals by match day

Statistics for the 2004–05 season
This is an overview of all the statistics for played matches in the 2004–05 season.

2004–05 team records

Top scorers

Placements

 Nigel de Jong is voted Player of the year by the supporters of Ajax. 
 Wesley Sneijder is voted Talent of the year by the supporters of Ajax.

Results
All times are in CEST

Johan Cruijff Schaal

Eredivisie

KNVB Cup

UEFA Champions League

Group stage

UEFA Cup

Round of 32

Amsterdam Tournament 

Final standings of the LG Amsterdam Tournament 2004

Friendlies

Transfers

Summer
For a list of all Dutch football transfers in the summer window (1 July 2004 to 1 September 2004) please see List of Dutch football transfers summer 2004.

In
 The following players moved to AFC Ajax.

Out
 The following players moved from AFC Ajax.

Winter
For a list of all Dutch football transfers in the winter window (1 January 2005 to 1 February 2005) please see List of Dutch football transfers winter 2004–05.

In
 The following players moved to AFC Ajax.

Out
 The following players moved from AFC Ajax.

External links
Ajax Amsterdam Official Website in Nederlandse
UEFA Website

References

Ajax
AFC Ajax seasons